Kellogg Arena is a 6,200-seat multi-purpose arena located in Battle Creek, Michigan.

History 
Kellogg Arena was built in 1980. It seats 4,675 for basketball games, 4,859 for ice shows, 4,433 for the circus, 1,500 for theatrical shows and concerts, 6,200 for end-stage concerts and 6,500 for center-stage concerts.

There is a hospitality room holding up to 65 people and there are five dressing rooms and seven concession stands as well as a production office.

It is home to the Battle Creek Cereal Killers Roller Derby League, Battle Creek Flight basketball team, as well as the former home for the Battle Creek Crunch, of the Great Lakes Indoor Football League.

Notable events 
On December 18, 2019, President Donald Trump held a rally at Kellogg Arena.

On September 30, 2023, professional wrestling superstar and local legend Rob Van Dam will be headlining the Battle In The Creek 3 at Kellogg Arena.

References

External links
Official site

Event venues established in 1980
Basketball venues in Michigan
Convention centers in Michigan
Sports in Battle Creek, Michigan
Buildings and structures in Calhoun County, Michigan
Tourist attractions in Calhoun County, Michigan
1980 establishments in Michigan
Sports venues completed in 1980
Indoor arenas in Michigan